Amblyderus is a genus of antlike flower beetles in the family Anthicidae. There are about 11 described species in Amblyderus.

Species
These 11 species belong to the genus Amblyderus:
 Amblyderus brunneus Pic, 1893
 Amblyderus granularis (LeConte, 1850)
 Amblyderus mitis van Hille, 1971
 Amblyderus obesus Casey, 1895
 Amblyderus owyhee Chandler, 1999
 Amblyderus pallens (LeConte, 1850)
 Amblyderus parviceps Casey, 1895
 Amblyderus scabricollis (La Ferté-Sénectère, 1847)
 Amblyderus spiniger Motschulsky, 1863
 Amblyderus triplehorni Weismann & Kondratieff, 1999
 Amblyderus werneri Weismann & Kondratieff, 1999

References

Further reading

 
 

Anthicidae
Articles created by Qbugbot